The 2020–21 South Dakota State Jackrabbits women's basketball represent South Dakota State University in the 2020–21 NCAA Division I women's basketball season. The Jackrabbits, led by twenty-first year head coach Aaron Johnston, compete in the Summit League. They play home games in Frost Arena in Brookings, South Dakota.

Previous season
The Jackrabbits went 23–10 overall and 13–3 in conference play, finishing second.

South Dakota State played North Dakota in the quarterfinals winning 72-43 and then followed it up two days later with a win in the semifinals against North Dakota State 76-56. The Jackrabbits made an appearance in the championship game against the 17th ranked South Dakota Coyotes, playing the Coyotes close they Jackrabbits fell short 58-63.

The postseason was put on hold due to the coronavirus outbreak and hopes for a possible NCAA at-large bid or automatic WNIT birth was dashed.

Departures

Additions

Roster

Schedule

|-
!colspan=9 style=| Non-conference regular season

|-
!colspan=9 style=| Summit League regular season

|-
!colspan=9 style=| Summit League Women's Tournament

|-
!colspan=9 style=| NCAA Women's Tournament

Source:

Rankings
2020–21 NCAA Division I women's basketball rankings

References

South Dakota State Jackrabbits women's basketball seasons
2020–21 Summit League women's basketball season
Jack
Jack
South Dakota State